Cliburn railway station was a station situated on the Eden Valley Railway in Westmorland (now in Cumbria), England. It served the village of Cliburn to the south. The station opened to passenger traffic on 9 June 1862, and closed on 17 September 1956.

Description
The station building and single platform were on the south side of the track, a signal box on the north side controlled the level crossing gates on the road to Cliburn. There was also a goods siding behind the station which was used to host a camping coach from 1937 to 1939 and was possibly visited by a coach in 1933 and 1934.

After closure the station house became a private residence, the signal box also survives and has been restored as a holiday cottage as of 2012.

References

Literature
 
 
 
 
 
 

Disused railway stations in Cumbria
Former North Eastern Railway (UK) stations
Railway stations in Great Britain opened in 1862
Railway stations in Great Britain closed in 1956
Eden District
1862 establishments in England